The 1992–93 Boston Bruins season was the team's 69th season.

Offseason

Regular season
The team finished second in the regular season behind the Pittsburgh Penguins. The Bruins played well all season long and finished their final 8 regular-season games with a perfect 8–0–0 record. The Bruins had the most shots on goal (2,893) during the regular season of all 24 teams. They also tied the New York Islanders and Washington Capitals for the fewest short-handed goals allowed (8) over 84 games.

Final standings

Schedule and results

Regular season

Playoffs

Playoffs

Despite being favored to win their first-round matchup against the Buffalo Sabres, the Bruins were eliminated in the Adams Division semi-finals by Buffalo in four straight games. Three games were decided in overtime.

Player statistics

Skaters

Goaltending

† Denotes player spent time with another team before joining the Bruins. Stats reflect time with the Bruins only.
‡ Denotes player was traded mid-season. Stats reflect time with the Bruins only.

Awards and records
Ray Bourque, runner up, Norris Trophy

During the postseason awards ceremony, Bruin players finished as runner-up on many of the awards; Bourque for the Norris, Oates for the Art Ross and Lady Byng Trophies, Joe Juneau (who had broken the NHL record for assists in a season by a left-winger, a mark he still holds) for the Calder Trophy, Dave Poulin for the Frank J. Selke Trophy, Moog for the William M. Jennings Trophy, and coach Brian Sutter for the Jack Adams Award. Bourque was named to the NHL All-Star First Team and Juneau to the NHL All-Rookie Team, while Oates finished third in voting among centermen for the All-Star First/Second Teams.

Records

Milestones

Transactions

Trades

Free agents

Waivers

Draft picks
Boston's draft picks at the 1992 NHL Entry Draft held at the Montreal Forum in Montreal, Quebec.

Notes
 The Bruins acquired this pick as the result of a trade on January 2, 1992 that sent Garry Galley, Wes Walz and a third-round pick in 1993 to Philadelphia in exchange for Gord Murphy, Brian Dobbin, a fourth-round pick in 1993 and this pick.
 The Bruins acquired this pick as the result of a trade on September 11, 1991 that sent  Norm Foster to Edmonton in exchange for this pick.
 The Bruins acquired this pick as the result of a trade on January 8, 1992 that sent Steve Bancroft and an eleventh-round pick in 1993 to Chicago in exchange for this pick.
 The Bruins second-round pick went to the Vancouver Canucks as the result of a trade on January 16, 1991 that sent Petri Skriko to Boston in exchange for this pick (40th overall).
 The Bruins third and seventh-round picks (64th and 160th overall) went to the St. Louis Blues as compensation for restricted free agents Glen Featherstone and Dave Thomlinson.
 The Bruins fourth-round pick went to the Minnesota North Stars as the result of a trade on August 21, 1990 that sent Ken Hodge Jr. to Boston in exchange for this pick (88th overall).

See also
1992–93 NHL season

References

 Bruins on Hockey Database

Boston Bruins seasons
Boston Bruins
Boston Bruins
Adams Division champion seasons
Boston Bruins
Boston Bruins
Bruins
Bruins